Lawrence County Courthouse may refer to:

 Lawrence County Courthouse (Arkansas), Walnut Ridge
 Lawrence County Courthouse (Illinois), Lawrenceville, Illinois
 Lawrence County Courthouse (Missouri), Mount Vernon, Missouri
 Lawrence County Courthouse (Mississippi), Monticello, Mississippi
 Lawrence County Courthouse (Ohio), Ironton, Ohio
 Lawrence County Courthouse (Pennsylvania), New Castle, Pennsylvania